Rugby in the Czech Republic may refer to:

Rugby league in the Czech Republic
Rugby union in the Czech Republic